Flúðir (sometimes written Fludir) is a village located in the Hrunamannahreppur municipality in the Southern Region, Iceland. It has a population of 818 (as of January 2020). It is not far from Geysir (the geyser first recorded in history) and the Gullfoss waterfall.

References

Populated places in Southern Region (Iceland)